The Miss Pennsylvania USA competition is the pageant that selects the representative for the state of Pennsylvania in the Miss USA pageant.  It has been previously known as Miss Pennsylvania Universe. This pageant is independently conducted and produced by Proctor Productions based in Cincinnati, Ohio. It was produced by Sanders & Associates, Inc., dba- Pageant Associates based in Buckhannon, West Virginia from 2001 to 2020.

The annual competition is currently held in Johnstown and has previously been hosted by Harrisburg, Greensburg, Monroeville, and Pittsburgh.

Michele McDonald, Miss USA 1971, is the only woman from Pennsylvania to win the Miss USA title. At just eighteen, she was the youngest competitor ever to win the crown. Their most recent placement came in 2019 when Kailyn Marie Perez reached in the Top 15.

The current titleholder is Billie LaRaé Owens of Phoenixville was crowned on April 24, 2022 at Richland Performing Arts Center in Johnstown. She represented Pennsylvania for the title of Miss USA 2022.

Gallery of titleholders

Results summary
Miss USA: Michele McDonald (1971)
4th runners-up: LauRen Merola (2008)
Top 6: Kimmarie Johnson (1993)
Top 10/12: Sandy Dell (1978), Julie Page (1983), Denise Epps (1989), Brenda Brabham (2005)
Top 15/16/20: Jeri Bauer (1953), Margaret Lineman (1962), Barbara Ann Woronko (1967), Gina Cerilli (2010), Jessica Billings (2013), Valerie Gatto (2014), Kailyn Marie Perez (2019)

Pennsylvania holds a record of 14 placements at Miss USA.

Awards
Best State Costume: Julie Page (1983)
Best in Swimsuit: Barbara Ann Woronko (1967)
Miss Photogenic: Sydney Robertson (2021)

Winners

Color key

Notes

References

External links

Pennsylvania
Pennsylvania culture
Women in Pennsylvania
Recurring events established in 1952
1952 establishments in Pennsylvania
Annual events in Pennsylvania